The 1 February 2010 Baghdad Bombings was a suicide bombing in Baghdad Iraq which killed at least 54 people, and wounded another 100. The attack was aimed at a group of Shia pilgrims walking to a religious festival.

Attack

The female suicide bomber blew herself up at a rest stop along the route the pilgrims were taking to a Shia religious festival held in Karbala. The rest stop had a security search area, which is where the bomber detonated her explosives belt. There was a similar attack on the same pilgrims last year, which killed 40.

References

See also

 List of terrorist incidents, 2010
 Terrorist incidents in Iraq in 2010

2010 murders in Iraq
21st-century mass murder in Iraq
Mass murder in 2010
Suicide bombings in Baghdad
Terrorist incidents in Iraq in 2010
Terrorist incidents in Baghdad
2010s in Baghdad
Violence against Shia Muslims in Iraq
February 2010 events in Iraq